In Andhra Pardesh 45 legal education centres are available for graduate law program.
 Acharya Nagarjuna University, Nagarjun NagarGuntur
 A.C. Andhra Christian College, Guntur
 All Saints Christian Law College, Visakhapatnam
 Andhra University College of Law, of Andhra University, Waltair, Visakhapatnam
 Anantha College of Law, Tirupati
 Anantapur Law College, Anantapur
 A.V.R. Amrutha College of Law, Visakhapatnam
 Bapatla Education Society’s Law College, Bapatla is closed in 2002
 C.R.R. Law College, Eluru
 Dr Ambedkar Global Law Institute, Tirupati, Old name Dr. B. R. Ambedkar Law College
 Dr. B.R. Ambedkar P.G. Centre, Etcherla, Srikakulam
 Daita Sriramulu Hindu College of Law, Machilipatnam
 Damodaram Sanjivayya National Law University, Visakhapatnam
 D.N. Raju Law College, Bhimavaram
 D.S.R. Hindu Law College, Machilipatnam
 Gitam School of Law, of GITAM University, Visakhapatnam
 G.S.K.M. Law College, Rajahmundry
 Indira Priyadarshini Law College, Ongole
 JC College of Law, Guntur
 KKC College of Law, Chittoor
 K.L.U. College of Law, Green Fields of Vaddeshwaram University of Guntur
 M.M. College of Law, Vijayawada
 M.P.R. Law College, Srikakulam
 M.R.V.R.G.R Law College, Viziayanagaram
 N.B.M. Law College, Visakhapatnam
 NVP Law College, Visakhapatnam
 Osmania Law College, Kurnool
 PS Raju Law College, Kakinada
 Rajiv Gandhi Institute of Law, Kakinada
 Sri R.K.M. Law College, Chittoor
 Shri Shiridi Sai Vidya Parishad Law College, Amalapuram
 Shri Shiridi Sai Vidya Parishad Law College, Anakapalli
 Smt. Basava Rama Tarakam Memorial Law College, Cuddapah
 Smt Velagapudi Durgamba Siddhartha Law College, Vijayawada
 Sree Vijaya Nagar Law College, Anantapur
 Sri Eshwar Reddy College of Law, Tirupati
 Sri P. Basi Reddy College of Law, Cuddapah
 Sri Prasunna College of Law, Kurnool
 Sri Sankara’s Law College, Kurnool
 Sri Venkateswara College of Law, Tirupati
 Sri Venkateshwara University, Tirupati
 Sri Krishnadevaraya University of Anantapur
 Sri Padmavati Mahila Viswavidyalayam of Tirupati
 Sri Venkateswara University of Tirupati
 University Law College, Waltair (Dr. B.R. Ambedkar College of Law)
 University College of Law, A. Nagarjuna]]
 V.D. Siddhartha Law College, Vijayawada]]
 Veeravalli College of Law, Rajahmundhry
 Vikramasimhapuri University of Nellore
 Visakha Law College, Visakhapatnam
 V.R. Law College, Nellore
 Yogi Vemana University,  Kapapa

See also
 Autonomous law schools in India
 Common Law Admission Test
 Legal education in India

References

India
 
Schools
Lists of universities and colleges in India
Law schools